Tarick Tarrio Ximines (born 7 October 2004) is a Jamaican professional footballer who plays as a right-back or midfielder for Cercle Brugge and the Jamaica national football team.

Club career 
In January 2023, Ximines signed a deal with Belgian club Cercle Brugge, in the Belgian First Division.

International career 

Ximines made his Jamaica international debut as a 17 year old versus Canada on March 27, 2022 in a Concacaf World Cup Qualifier at BMO Field in Toronto, Ontario. He became the youngest ever Reggae Boy to feature for the senior team in a Concacaf World Cup Qualifier at 17 years and 5 months.

Career statistics

Club

References 

Jamaican footballers
2004 births
Living people
Association football midfielders
Harbour View F.C. players
Jamaica under-20 international footballers